Aisea Tohi (born April 15, 1987) is a track and field sprint athlete who competes internationally for Tonga.

Tohi represented Tonga at the 2008 Summer Olympics in Beijing. He competed at the 100 metres sprint and placed 7th in his heat without advancing to the second round. He ran the distance in a time of 11.17 seconds.

Achievements

References

External links
 
Sports reference biography

1987 births
Living people
Athletes (track and field) at the 2008 Summer Olympics
Olympic athletes of Tonga
Tongan male sprinters
People from Tongatapu